Cypha is a genus of beetles belonging to the family Staphylinidae.

The genus has almost cosmopolitan distribution.

Species:
 Cypha abyssiniensis (Pace, 1986)
 Cypha ampliata Assing, 2010
 Cypha angularis (Luze, 1902)

References

Staphylinidae
Staphylinidae genera